The Sanskaar Valley School is a private, K–12 co-educational day-boarding and residential school in Bhopal, Madhya Pradesh, India. It runs under the aegis of the Sharda Devi Charitable Trust and Dainik Bhaskar Group.

References

External links 
 

Schools in Bhopal
Round Square schools
Boarding schools in Madhya Pradesh
Private schools in Madhya Pradesh
Cambridge schools in India